Vrnograč (Cyrillic: Врнограч) is a town in Bosnia and Herzegovina. It is located in the municipality of Velika Kladuša and the Una-Sana Canton Federation of Bosnia and Herzegovina. In the census of 1991, it had  people, including a majority of Bosniaks. According to the 2013 census, its population was 762.

Sport 
Vrnograč has one football stadium that is home to the football team NK Mladost Vrnograč.

Demographics

Population Distribution (1991) 

In 1991, the broader municipal area had 1,773 inhabitants, divided as follows:

The town has a majority Bosnian Muslim population.

See also 

 Municipalities of Bosnia and Herzegovina
Crvarevac
Bužim
Zborište, municipality of Velika Kladuša

References

External links
 Vrnograč Satellite View

Populated places in Velika Kladuša